CKX-TV, VHF analogue channel 5, was a television station licensed to Brandon, Manitoba, Canada, which served as a private affiliate of CBC Television. Owned by CTVglobemedia, it was the first privately owned television station in Manitoba. It shared its call letters with its former sister station, CKX-FM, owned by Astral Media (formerly Standard Radio).

CKX-TV shared studios with CKX-FM and CKXA-FM (then known as "101.1 The Farm") on Victoria Avenue in Brandon; CKX-TV's transmitter was located in Oakland, Manitoba (it is now occupied by CKY-DT rebroadcaster CKYB-TV).

As a private affiliate of the CBC, the station aired most CBC network programming, but also aired some programs from A. Currently, CBC programming is available through CBC's Winnipeg station CBWT, on Westman Cable channel 6, taking up CKX's former slot.

In February 2009, CTV announced that CKX was up for sale as CBC would not continue its affiliation agreement. In July 2009, it was announced that Bluepoint Investment Corporation would buy the station for a dollar. However, Bluepoint pulled out of the sale on October 1, resulting in the station's closing a day later.

History
The station was founded by John Craig and went on the air on January 28, 1955, a day which marked Craig Media's start in television broadcasting.

In February 1959, CKX asked Manitoba Telephone System (MTS) to apply to the CBC to extend their television signals to four additional Manitoba communities; Dauphin, Swan River, The Pas and Flin Flon.

For nearly half a century, the station remained under the ownership of Craig Media.

During the early 1980s when the CRTC had called for applications for a new television station serving southern Manitoba, CKX-TV had raised fears that extending CKND-TVs signal into the Westman area would split the revenue from national advertisers which could cause CKX-TV to operate in the red.

In 2004, Craig Media announced a deal to sell its broadcasting assets to CHUM Limited. The sale was approved by the Canadian Radio-television and Telecommunications Commission (CRTC) on November 19, 2004, and became official on December 1.

CHUM relaunched the original Craig Media A-Channel stations as new affiliates of Citytv on August 2, 2005, at the same time as the existing NewNet stations picked up the "A Channel" name. It generally left CKX's programming alone, though the A-Channel logo was occasionally seen during primetime programming.

On January 15, 2007, master control for CKX-TV was moved back from Portage la Prairie to Brandon.

Ownership changed hands once again on June 22, 2007, as CHUM Limited was sold to CTVglobemedia. Originally, CTVglobemedia wanted to retain CHUM's Citytv system and sell CKX-TV, CHUM's A-Channel stations, and several speciality channels to Rogers Communications. However, this was denied by the CRTC, and CTV was forced to sell the Citytv stations to Rogers instead. Richard Gray was named the head of news for CKX-TV and the A Channel stations. Gray reports directly to the CTVgm corporate group, as opposed to CTV News, to preserve independent news presentation and management. CKX-TV was CTV's first CBC affiliate since selling their CBC stations in Northern Ontario and Saskatchewan to the CBC in 2002.

In early 2009, CBC decided it would not renew CKX's affiliation agreement past its expiration date of August 31, 2009. When CTV offered to sell the station directly to the CBC for a dollar, they refused, saying they could not afford the station's ongoing operational costs, and costs associated with the upcoming digital transition. Because of this, CTV put the station up for sale, saying it would shut it down on August 31 if no buyer was found.

On April 30, 2009, Shaw Communications announced it would purchase CKX, along with two of CTV's A stations (CHWI in Windsor, Ontario and CKNX in Wingham, Ontario) from CTVgm for a dollar each. However, it was reported on June 30 that Shaw had backed out of the deal. Instead, on July 16, CTV announced that Bluepoint Investment Corporation, a new company owned by media veteran Bruce Claassen, would buy CKX for a dollar. The deal was planned to close by December 31, 2009, pending CRTC approval. Bluepoint intended to keep at least some CBC programming, though CKX was still a full CBC affiliate after August 31.

However, Bluepoint pulled out of the sale on October 1, citing inability to get satellite coverage. As a result, CTV shut the station down the next day, after its 6 PM newscast, bringing the station to show a screen thanking viewers for several hours. The last image televised on CKX-TV before going to black was the corporate logo and copyright notice for CTVglobemedia. The station's website, ckxtv.com, also switched to a slate, thanking viewers and directing them to localtvmatters.ca and redirecting to the Bravo Canada website, to learn about CTV's position that local television was being endangered.

The station was the second major TV station in Canada to have gone dark since 1977 (when CFVO-TV in Hull, Quebec left the air; all other defunct stations in Canada became repeaters of other stations almost seamlessly), the other being CHCA-TV in Red Deer, Alberta, closing about one month before CKX. The station's license is still active after the station's closure, although CHCA's license was revoked in December 2009, and CFVO-TV's license was transferred to Radio-Quebec (now Télé-Québec) as that station later became CIVO-TV. The Access Alberta stations CIAN-DT and CJAL-DT went dark on August 31, 2011. Two months later, it was Quebecor-owned CKXT-TV, which went dark on November 1, 2011.

By the time the CBC closed down its network of rebroadcasters on July 31, 2012, the network never reestablished an aerial presence in Brandon.

Digital television
Before its closure in 2009, CKX had not begun broadcasting in digital on its allocated channel 49.

Had the station remained on the air, after the phaseout of analogue television in Canada on August 31, 2011, CKX-DT was to remain on 49. With the use of PSIP, television receivers would have displayed CKX-DT's virtual channel as 5. Following the station's closedown, the allocations for its analog and digital frequencies became open for future stations.

News
CKX aired a one-hour local noon program, The Noon Show, from 12 noon to 1 p.m. daily while it also aired a live one-hour evening newscast, CKX News at 6, from 6 to 7 p.m. every weekday. CKX used to air a late-night half-hour newscast from 11 to 11:30 p.m. until cuts were made to the station in the 1990s and 2000.

Despite its local orientation, CKX news programming generally lagged in the ratings behind Winnipeg-based CTV station CKY-TV, which has a rebroadcaster in Brandon but limited news coverage of the region.

Former CKX personalities
 Darren Dreger, former sports anchor, now with TSN
 Jill Officer, former reporter
 Leah Hextall, former sports anchor, now with ESPN
 Ron Thompson, former meteorologist
 Doug Johnson, announcer, farm reporter
 Barrie Dunsmore, announcer
 Don McGowan, announcer
 Peter Parker, announcer
 Brian Denike, announcer
 Henry Stothard sports announcer
 Kim Kaschor, Anchor
 Dean Millard, sports

1980s TV News Hosts & Reporters:
Mike Sposito
Mark Evans and Alison Paine
Marianne Klowak and Miles Ness
Ted Deller
Bob Bruce (Neeve)
Mary Barroll
Jack Haganaars
Harvey Hjorth and Barry Lamb, Brian Lawley, Matt Burlett (Farm)
Lee Powell, Keith McMahon, Rick MacDonald, Mike Beauregard, Chris Sedans
Jodi Craig (Rutledge)
Glen Cassie
Debbie MacKenzie
Dawna Friesen 
Nancy Gregory
Heather Reimer
Tammi Christopher
Vera-Lynn Kubinec
Daniel Barry

Transmitters
These were CKX's rebroadcasters at the time of its closure.

References

External links
 

 YouTube - CKX's last 6 PM newscast

KX
Television channels and stations established in 1955
Television channels and stations disestablished in 2009
KX
Mass media in Brandon, Manitoba
1955 establishments in Manitoba
2009 disestablishments in Manitoba
KX-TV